The Prince's Life Regiment was a Royal Danish Army infantry regiment. The motto of the regiment was "Gloria Finis" (Honor above all).

History
Because one of the regiment's antecedents was the life regiment of Queen Ingrid, the Queen Mother, the regiment had both Prince Henrik's and the late Queen Mother's cyphers on its Regimental Colour. The regiment was raised during the reign of King Frederik III in 1657 under the command of Ernst Albrecht von Eberstein. Over the years it underwent many changes of name, the last taking place in 1961.

The Regiment participated in the Northern Wars (1657–1660), Scanian War (1675–1679), Great Northern War (1709–1720), First Schleswig War (1848–1850) and Second Schleswig War (1864). It was furthermore in foreign service during 1689–1697 and 1701–1714. The regimental flag had the battle honours Nyborg 1659, Wismar 1675, Rygen 1715, Treldeskansen 1849, Dybbøl 1849 and Dybbøl 1864.

From the 1960s to 2000 the regiment had two mechanised and two infantry battalions, from 2000 to 2004 it had four mechanised and three infantry battalions.

In 2000, two other regiments, Schleswig Regiment of Foot and Queen's Life Regiment, were merged into Prince's Life Regiment. In August 2005, the regiment was amalgamated with Jutland Dragoon Regiment and its battalions were disbanded.

Organisation
Disband units 
  1st battalion (I/PLR), raised in 1961 and disbanded in 2004. Mechanized Infantry Battalion.
  Saff Company 
  1st Armored Infantry Company 
  2nd Armored Infantry Company 
  3rd Tank Squadron
  4th Motorised Infantry Company 
  2nd battalion (II/PLR), raised in 1961 and disbanded in 2004. Mechanized Infantry Battalion from 1979.
  Saff Company 
  1st Armored Infantry Company 
  2nd Armored Infantry Company 
  3rd Tank Squadron
  4th Motorised Infantry Company 
  3rd battalion (III/PLR), raised in 1961 and disbanded in 2004. Mechanized Infantry Battalion from 2000 to 2004. 
  Saff Company 
  1st Armored Infantry Company 
  2nd Armored Infantry Company 
  3rd Tank Squadron
  4th Motorised Infantry Company        
  4th battalion (IV/PLR), raised in 1961 and disbanded in 2004. Infantry Battalion. Mechanized Infantry Battalion from 2000 to 2004.
  Saff Company 
  1st Armored Infantry Company 
  2nd Armored Infantry Company 
  3rd Tank Squadron
  4th Motorised Infantry Company 
  5th battalion (V/PLR), raised in 1961 and disbanded in 2004. Infantry Battalion. Mechanized Infantry Battalion from 2000 to 2004 
  Saff Company 
  1st Armored Infantry Company 
  2nd Motorised Infantry Company
  3rd Tank Squadron
  4th Motorised Infantry Company  
  6th battalion (VI/PLR), raised in 2000 and disbanded in 2004. Infantry Battalion.
  Saff Company 
  1st Infantry Company 
  2nd Infantry Company 
  3rd Infantry Company            
  7th battalion (VII/PLR), raised in 2000 and disbanded in 2004. Infantry Battalion.
  Saff Company 
  1st Infantry Company 
  2nd Infantry Company 
  3rd Infantry Company 
  Tank destroyer Squadron/2nd Territorial Region (1979-1983)
  2nd Staff Company/Rear Combat Group/Danish Division (2000-2004)
  LRRP Company. (2000-2004) Part of Danish Division
  Prince's Music Corps, (1961-2004)

Names of the regiment

Standards

References

 Lærebog for Hærens Menige, Hærkommandoen, marts 1960

Danish Army regiments
1657 establishments in Denmark
Military units and formations established in 1657
Military units and formations disestablished in 2005